In mathematics, the J-homomorphism is a mapping from the homotopy groups of the special orthogonal groups to the homotopy groups of spheres.

Definition
Whitehead's original homomorphism is defined geometrically, and gives a homomorphism

(Hopf defined this for the special case .)

The J-homomorphism can be defined as follows. 
An element of the special orthogonal group SO(q) can be regarded as a map

and the homotopy group ) consists of homotopy classes of maps from the r-sphere to SO(q).
Thus an element of  can be represented by a map

Applying the Hopf construction to this gives a map

Taking a limit as q tends to infinity gives the stable J-homomorphism in stable homotopy theory:

where  is the infinite special orthogonal group, and the right-hand side is the r-th stable stem of the stable homotopy groups of spheres.

Image of the J-homomorphism

The group  is given by Bott periodicity. It is always cyclic; and if r is positive, it is of order 2 if r is 0 or 1 modulo 8, infinite if r is 3 modulo 4, and order 1 otherwise . In particular the image of the stable J-homomorphism is cyclic. If r is 0 or 1 mod 8 and positive, the order of the image is 2 (so in this case the J-homomorphism is injective). In the remaining cases where r is 2, 4, 5, or 6 mod 8 the image is trivial because  is trivial.

{| class="wikitable" style="text-align: center; background-color:white"
|-
! style="text-align:right;width:10%" | r
! style="width:5%" | 0
! style="width:5%" | 1
! style="width:5%" | 2
! style="width:5%" | 3
! style="width:5%" | 4
! style="width:5%" | 5
! style="width:5%" | 6
! style="width:5%" | 7
! style="width:5%" | 8
! style="width:5%" | 9
! style="width:5%" | 10
! style="width:5%" | 11
! style="width:5%" | 12
! style="width:5%" | 13
! style="width:5%" | 14
! style="width:5%" | 15
! style="width:5%" | 16
! style="width:5%" | 17
|-
! style="text-align:right" | 
| 1 || 2 || 1 ||  || 1 || 1 || 1 ||  || 2 || 2 || 1 ||  || 1 || 1 || 1 ||  || 2 || 2
|-
! style="text-align:right" | 
| 1 || 2 || 1 || 24 || 1 || 1 || 1 || 240 || 2 || 2 || 1 || 504 || 1 || 1 || 1 || 480 || 2 || 2
|-
! style="text-align:right" | 
|  || 2 || 2 || 24 || 1 || 1 || 2 || 240 || 22 || 23 || 6 || 504 || 1 || 3 || 22 || 480×2 || 22 || 24
|-
! style="text-align:right" | 
|  ||  ||  || 1⁄6 ||  ||  ||  || −1⁄30 ||  ||  ||  || 1⁄42 ||  ||  ||  || −1⁄30 ||  || 
|}

Applications
 introduced the group J(X) of a space X, which for X a sphere is the image of the J-homomorphism in a suitable dimension.

The cokernel of the J-homomorphism  appears in the group Θn of h-cobordism classes of oriented homotopy n-spheres.

References

. 

 

Homotopy theory
Topology of Lie groups